The National Agency for Disaster Countermeasure, abbreviated as BNPB, is the Indonesian board for natural disaster affairs. It was established in 2008 to replace the National Disaster Management Coordinating Board ( or Bakornas PB). BNPB is directly responsible to the President of Indonesia and the chairman is directly appointed by the President.

History
On 20 August 1945, the Indonesian government established the Agency for Assisting Families of War Victims (abbreviated as BPKKP) and its focus was to assist the war victims and their respective families during the Indonesian National Revolution.

In 1966, the government established the advisory board of Central Natural Disaster Management (abbreviated as BP2BA) through the Presidential Decree Number 256 of 1966. The board was responsible to the Minister of Social Affairs. A year later, the Cabinet Presidium through Decree number 14/U/KEP/I/1967, established the National Coordination Team for Disaster Management (abbreviated as TKP2BA).

Bakornas PB was established in 1979 to replace the Advisory Board for Natural Disasters, which was established in 1966. The organization in form of the current BNPB was established in 2008, in accordance to Presidential Decree 8 of 2008.

On 21 January 2019, President Joko Widodo elevated the rank of the BNPB head to a minister-level official, allowing the agency to directly take over commanding functions during natural disasters.

Duties and functions

Duties 
 Provide guidance and direction on disaster management effort that includes disaster prevention, emergency response, rehabilitation, and reconstruction in a fair and equitable
 Assigning the standardization and implementation of disaster management needs based on laws and regulations
 Delivering information to community disaster management humans
 Disaster management reporting to the President once a month in normal conditions and at all times in a state of emergency
 Use and account for donations / support national and international
 Account for the use of funds received from the State humans
 Carry out other obligations in accordance with laws and et human
 Develop guidelines for the establishment of the Regional Disaster Management Agency

Functions 
Formulation and establishment of disaster management policies and handling of refugees to act quickly and appropriately and effectively and efficiently; and Coordinating implementation of disaster management activities in a planned, integrated, and comprehensive.

Amongst other things, the Board issues regular information about the status of alerts for selected Indonesian volcanoes.  In issuing these information bulletins, the Board draws on the advice of the Centre of Vulcanology and Geological Hazard Mitigation (often known as PVMBG from the Indonesian name for the centre, Pusat Vulkanology dan Mitigasi Bencana Geologi).  These bulletins are intended to warn local residents of likely threats and also help in planning for emergency response activities.  The alerts are also useful for visitors who may be planning trips to these sites.  As of September 2011, five volcanoes were included on the Level III "Alert" list and 12 were on the Level II "Vigilant" list

The Board has noted that financial support for disaster responses in Indonesia remains relatively limited.  A spokesperson for the board observed that a sum of only Rp 4 trillion (around $US 470 million) had been allocated to support disaster relief in Indonesia  during 2011.

References

External links 
 BNPB History (Indonesian or English)
 Centre for Volcanology and Disaster Hazard Mitigation website (Indonesian)
 Australia-Indonesia Facility for Disaster Risk Reduction

Government of Indonesia
Emergency management in Indonesia